dnaH is a gene involved in DNA replication.

References 

DNA replication